Víctor Machín Pérez (born 2 November 1989), known as Vitolo, is a Spanish professional footballer who plays for Las Palmas on loan from Atlético Madrid mainly as a left winger and but also as a forward.

He began his career with Las Palmas before joining Sevilla in 2013, where he won the Europa League three times. He signed with Atlético Madrid in 2017, conquering the same competition in his first season and adding the subsequent Super Cup.

Vitolo won his first cap for Spain in 2015.

Club career

Las Palmas
Vitolo was born in Las Palmas. He came through the youth ranks at hometown club UD Las Palmas, playing for two years with the B team before making the breakthrough in the 2010–11 season, with the Canary Islands side in the Segunda División. He made his debut on 28 August 2010, playing the full 90 minutes in a 3–2 home win against Gimnàstic de Tarragona, and scored his first goal for the club in a 4–1 defeat of AD Alcorcón on 11 September, also at home.

On 27 November 2010, in another home fixture, against Rayo Vallecano, Vitolo sustained an anterior cruciate ligament injury on his right knee that ruled him out for the rest of the campaign. He scored a squad-best ten times in 2011–12, repeating the feat the following season with 15.

Sevilla
Vitolo joined Sevilla FC on 28 June 2013, after agreeing to a four-year contract. He made his debut in La Liga on 18 August by featuring the full 90 minutes in a 1–3 home loss to Atlético Madrid, and scored his first goal in the competition on 10 November, contributing to a 3–1 away victory over RCD Espanyol.

In his first season in Andalusia, Vitolo played 45 games in all competitions and scored eight times; this included four in 16 matches in the club's victorious run in the UEFA Europa League. On 12 March 2015 he scored the fastest-ever goal in the continental competition, finding the net after just 13 seconds to help to a 3–1 away win against fellow Spaniards Villarreal CF; he was surpassed on 15 September 2016 by Jan Sýkora from FC Slovan Liberec, who netted against Qarabağ FK at 10,69.

With three league goals in March 2015 – half of his total for the season up to then – Vitolo was voted La Liga Player of the Month. On 27 May, he assisted Carlos Bacca's winning goal as Sevilla retained their Europa League crown with a 3–2 defeat of FC Dnipro in Warsaw.

Atlético Madrid
On 12 July 2017, Vitolo signed for Atlético Madrid on a five-year deal. However, due to the club's transfer ban which did not allow it to register any new players, he was sent on loan to Las Palmas until December.

Vitolo made his competitive debut for Atlético on 3 January 2018, coming on as a 59th-minute substitute for Yannick Carrasco in the 4–0 away win over Lleida Esportiu in the Copa del Rey. He scored his first goal in the second leg, a 3–0 victory.

Deemed surplus to requirements by manager Diego Simeone, Vitolo made only ten appearances in the 2020–21 campaign as the team won their first national championship in seven years. On 4 July 2021, he was loaned to Getafe CF.

In July 2022, still owned by Atlético, Vitolo returned to both the second tier and Las Palmas.

International career
On 20 March 2015, coach Vicente del Bosque called up former Spain under-19 international Vitolo for the first time to the senior squad for a UEFA Euro 2016 qualifier against Ukraine. He did not take part in the match, a 1–0 win at his club ground, the Ramón Sánchez Pizjuán Stadium, but made his debut in the following fixture, a 2–0 friendly loss at the Amsterdam Arena to the Netherlands on the 31st, replacing Pedro at half time.

Career statistics

Club

International

 Spain score listed first, score column indicates score after each Vitolo goal.

Honours
Sevilla
UEFA Europa League: 2013–14, 2014–15, 2015–16
Copa del Rey runner-up: 2015–16
Supercopa de España runner-up: 2016
UEFA Super Cup runner-up: 2014, 2015, 2016

Atlético Madrid
La Liga: 2020–21
UEFA Europa League: 2017–18
UEFA Super Cup: 2018

Individual
La Liga Player of the Month: March 2015

Notes

References

External links

1989 births
Living people
Spanish footballers
Footballers from Las Palmas
Association football wingers
Association football forwards
La Liga players
Segunda División players
Segunda División B players
Tercera División players
UD Las Palmas Atlético players
UD Las Palmas players
Sevilla FC players
Atlético Madrid footballers
Getafe CF footballers
UEFA Europa League winning players
Spain international footballers